Asota eusemioides is a moth of the family Erebidae first described by Felder in 1874. It is found in Papua New Guinea and Indonesia.

Subspecies
Asota eusemioides eusemioides (Papua New Guinea)
Asota eusemioides subrupta (Papua New Guinea, Indonesia)

References

Asota (moth)
Moths of New Guinea
Moths of Indonesia
Moths described in 1874